John J. Lawn is an American politician and businessman, currently serving as a member of the Massachusetts House of Representatives. He is a member of the Democratic Party.

Education 
Lawn earned a Bachelor of Arts degree in political science and sociology from Merrimack College.

Career 
After the incumbent representative Peter Koutoujian resigned from the Massachusetts House to serve as Middlesex County Sheriff, Lawn won the May 11, 2011, special election to replace him. Lawn had previously been a member of the Watertown City Council and owned a real estate business. In October 2019, Lawn endorsed Joe Biden in the 2020 Democratic Party presidential primaries.

See also
 2019–2020 Massachusetts legislature
 2021–2022 Massachusetts legislature

References

Living people
Democratic Party members of the Massachusetts House of Representatives
People from Watertown, Massachusetts
21st-century American politicians
Year of birth missing (living people)